Peter of Lusignan (French: Pierre de Lusignan); died 10 February 1451) was a regent of the Kingdom of Cyprus and titular Count of Tripoli. He was son of James of Lusignan (died 1395/1397), Titular Count of Tripoli, married in 1385 to his cousin Mary, ditte Mariette, (wrongly called Margaret) of Lusignan (c. 1360 – c. 1397), once engaged to Carlo Visconti, daughter of his uncle Peter I of Lusignan and second wife Eleanor of Aragon, and paternal grandson of John of Lusignan and his second wife Alice of Ibelin. He was a member of the House of Lusignan.

Life
Besides being Regent of Cyprus and titular Count of Tripoli, he was also titular Constable and titular Seneschal of Jerusalem.

Marriage and issue
He married c. 1415 his cousin Isabella of Lusignan, Princess of Cyprus, daughter of James I of Lusignan, King of Cyprus, and wife Helvis or Helisia of Brunswick-Grubenhagen, without issue.

He had one illegitimate son: 
 Phoebus of Lusignan, Titular Marshal of Armenia and Titular Lord of Sidon

Sources
 

14th-century births
1451 deaths
People of the Kingdom of Cyprus
Regents of Cyprus
Counts of Tripoli
House of Poitiers-Lusignan